Stephen Champlin (17 November 1789 – 20 February 1870) was an officer in the United States Navy during the War of 1812.

Born in Kingston, Rhode Island, Champlin entered the Navy as a sailing master 22 May 1812. He commanded the schooner  in her capture of the British  during the Battle of Lake Erie, and later in the War of 1812 was wounded when his ship was taken on Lake Huron. Retired in 1855, Captain Champlin was later promoted to Commodore on the retired list, and died in Buffalo, New York and is buried at Forest Lawn Cemetery (Buffalo).

Two ships have been named  for him, as was Champlin, Minnesota

References

1789 births
1870 deaths
United States Navy officers
United States Navy personnel of the War of 1812
Cornell family
People from South Kingstown, Rhode Island